Tsvetan Valentinov Genkov (born 8 February 1984) is a Bulgarian footballer who plays as a striker for OFK Kostinbrod.

Career

Lokomotiv Mezdra
Born in Mezdra, Genkov began his career in the local Lokomotiv, previously having been a track and field athlete. He made his debut during the 2001–02 season on 14 October 2001 in a 0–2 away loss against Sitomir Nikopol in the campaign of V AFG. On 12 May 2002, Genkov scored his first goal in a 2–2 home draw against Olimpik Teteven. As of the 2002–03 season he became first-choice forward scoring 14 goals. After 24 goals in the next season he transferred to Lokomotiv Sofia.

Lokomotiv Sofia
He made his debut for Lokomotiv Sofia on 6 August 2004, in a 0–2 away loss against Litex Lovech. In Sofia, Genkov established himself in one of the leading A PFG clubs and helped his team to reach the fourth place in 2005–06 and secure a place in the 2006–07 UEFA Cup. During the qualification rounds, Genkov scored four goals in six matches. In Bulgaria's A PFG, he became the top goalscorer of 2006–07 with 27 goals, leading Lokomotiv to the third position and 2007–08 UEFA Cup qualification.

Dynamo Moscow
On 9 June 2007, he signed a four-and-a-half-year contract with Dynamo Moscow for a transfer fee of €2.25 million.

Return to Lokomotiv Sofia
In January 2010, Genkov was loaned out to his former club. On 7 March 2010, he netted twice in the 5–1 away win against FC Sportist Svoge. In the following season, with 11 goals to his name, Genkov had climbed up to second place in the scoring charts in the A PFG by the time his loan expired.

Wisła Kraków

On 28 January 2011, Genkov joined Polish Ekstraklasa side Wisła Kraków on a three and a half-year deal for an undisclosed fee from Dynamo Moscow. He won the Ekstraklasa championship in his debut season. Genkov was club's top goalscorer in the second part of the season with six goals in the league.

In the following season, he was a starter in all six matches in the Wisła's ultimately unsuccessful UEFA Champions League qualifying campaign. On 9 September, Genkov picked up an injury at beginning of the league match against Lech Poznań. He returned to play on 15 October, scoring the winning goal in a 3–1 home win over Jagiellonia Białystok. Genkov also netted the winning goal in a 2–1 victory over FC Twente, in the last UEFA Europa League group stage match, which lead his team to qualify for the round of 32.

On 16 February 2012, he scored a late equaliser in the first leg tie against Standard Liège. Wisła Kraków played with ten-men for most of the match after Michał Czekaj was sent off in the 27th minute. He scored his first hat-trick for Wisła Kraków on 14 April, scoring all three of his team's goals in a 3–2 home win over ŁKS Łódź in the Ekstraklasa. Genkov was a top goalscorer of 2011–12 Polish Cup with four goals from three games.

Levski Sofia
Genkov signed with Levski Sofia on 19 June 2013 on a three-year deal. He was not registered for the 1st round of the UEFA Europa League games against Kazakh club Irtysh Pavlodar, which his team lost by an aggregate score of 0–2. Genkov made his official debut for Levski Sofia on 21 July 2013, in the 1–2 away loss against Botev Plovdiv in an A PFG match. He scored his first goal for the team from Sofia a week later in the 1–2 home defeat inflicted by Lokomotiv Plovdiv.

Okzhetpes
On 14 February 2017, Genkov signed for Okzhetpes of the Kazakhstan Premier League.

OFK Kostinbrod
After three years without a club, Genkov signed with Bulgarian fourth division club OFK Kostinbrod in March 2020. As of September 2021, Genkov was still playing for Kostinbrod.

International career
Receiving his first call-up for an official match in March 2005, he was capped nine times for Bulgaria national under-21 football team, scoring three goals. Genkov received his first senior international cap for Bulgaria on 17 August 2005 in a friendly match against Turkey, which they won 3–1, coming on as a substitute for Dimitar Berbatov after one hour of play.

Outside football
Genkov has participated in charity campaigns during his spell with Wisla. He also represents Bulgarian company TRYMAX.

Career statistics

Club

International
Statistics accurate as of match played 6 September 2011

Honours

Club
Wisła Kraków
Ekstraklasa: 2010–11

Individual
A PFG Top Goalscorer: 2006–07
Polish Cup Top Goalscorer: 2011–12

References

External links
 
 Profile at LevskiSofia.info

Bulgarian footballers
1984 births
Living people
First Professional Football League (Bulgaria) players
Russian Premier League players
Ekstraklasa players
PFC Lokomotiv Mezdra players
FC Lokomotiv 1929 Sofia players
FC Dynamo Moscow players
Wisła Kraków players
PFC Levski Sofia players
Denizlispor footballers
FC Lokomotiv Gorna Oryahovitsa players
FC Okzhetpes players
Bulgaria international footballers
Bulgarian expatriate footballers
Bulgarian expatriate sportspeople in Russia
Bulgarian expatriate sportspeople in Poland
Bulgarian expatriate sportspeople in Turkey
Bulgarian expatriate sportspeople in Kazakhstan
Expatriate footballers in Russia
Expatriate footballers in Poland
Expatriate footballers in Turkey
Expatriate footballers in Kazakhstan
Association football forwards